Strzałki may refer to the following places:
Strzałki, Łódź Voivodeship (central Poland)
Strzałki, Gostynin County in Masovian Voivodeship (east-central Poland)
Strzałki, Grójec County in Masovian Voivodeship (east-central Poland)
Strzałki, Ostrołęka County in Masovian Voivodeship (east-central Poland)